Char Paise() is a 1955 crime drama Bollywood film starring Kishore Kumar, Shyama in lead roles.

Plot
Gangsters first try unknowingly to do business with a plain-clothed police officer, and after failing, they try to disrupt his personal life.

Cast
 Kishore Kumar as CID Inspector Mohan
 Shyama as Seema
 Johnny Walker as Dasu
 Agha as Basu
 Jayant as Chandermohan "Chandu"

Soundtrack

External links
 

1955 films
1950s Hindi-language films
Indian crime drama films
1955 crime drama films
Indian black-and-white films